K617 is a French classical music record label based in Metz and founded by Alain Pacquier, music author and creator of the Festival de Saintes at the Abbaye aux Dames in Charente-Maritime, and the Festival de Sarrebourg (July) at the Couvent de Saint Ulrich. The name "K617" refers to Mozart's Adagio and Rondo for glass harmonica, flute, oboe, viola and cello, K.617).

Recording

les Chemins du Baroque
The activity for which the label was initially most noted relates to a project of Pacquier's, les Chemins du Baroque, exploration of Latin-America's baroque musical heritage. Pacquier's second book Le retour des caravelles recounts the story of 20 years of exploration of Latin-American baroque music.

Mémoire musicale de Lorraine
A second strand of K617's activity relates to music of Lorraine. This series has recovered various forgotten works of Théodore Gouvy (1819-1898): Requiem, Stabat Mater, dramatic cantatas (Elektra, Egill) and chamber music (string quartets and works for wind ensembles).

Other early music
The label has also branched out in a variety of more and less conventional early music and classical recordings. The "travels" of K617 extend to Poland, Marcin Mielczewski, and Jesuit missions in China, Jean Joseph Marie Amiot.

Artists
 Gabriel Garrido - Latin American baroque
 Jean-Claude Malgoire - Mozart and classical
 La Chapelle Rhénane, direction :fr:Benoît Haller - the works of Heinrich Schütz
 Ensemble Lucidarium, direction :fr:Avery Gosfield, Francis Biggi - Medieval and Renaissance Music

References

Classical music record labels